The Money Laundering Control Act of 1986 (Public Law 99-570) is a United States Act of Congress that made money laundering a federal crime. It was passed in 1986. It for the first time in the United States criminalized money laundering. Section 1956 prohibits individuals from engaging in a financial transaction with proceeds that were generated from certain specific crimes, known as "specified unlawful activities" (SUAs). Additionally, the law requires that an individual specifically intend in making the transaction to conceal the source, ownership or control of the funds. There is no minimum threshold of money, nor is there the requirement that the transaction succeed in actually disguising the money. Moreover, a "financial transaction" has been broadly defined, and need not involve a financial institution, or even a business. Merely passing money from one person to another, so long as it is done with the intent to disguise the source, ownership, location or control of the money, has been deemed a financial transaction under the law. Section 1957  prohibits spending in excess of $10,000 derived from an SUA, regardless of whether the individual wishes to disguise it. This carries a lesser penalty than money laundering, and unlike the money laundering statute, requires that the money pass through a financial institution.

Money Laundry Prevention Officers
 In France: AMF 
 In Germany: Pequris.
 In Spain: 
 In USA: IMLPO

See also

 Operation Protect Our Children
 Housing and Community Development Act of 1992

References

External links
 § 1956. Laundering of monetary instruments
 § 1957. Engaging in monetary transactions in property derived from specified unlawful activity

1986 in law
99th United States Congress
Anti-money laundering measures
United States federal criminal legislation
United States federal financial legislation
1986 in American law